St John's the Evangelist Church is an active parish church in the town of Goole, East Riding of Yorkshire, England. It was built between 1843 and 1848 in the Gothic Revival style and been an active place of worship for Christians since. The church is located on Church Street, near to the town centre and port; it is the main parish church of the town.

References

Grade II listed churches in the East Riding of Yorkshire
Churches completed in 1848
Goole